Antonio Polcenigo (18 April 1647 – April, 1724) was a Roman Catholic prelate who served as Bishop of Feltre (1684–1724).

Biography
Antonio Polcenigo was born in Fanna, Italy on 18 April 1647 and ordained a priest on 8 August 1683. On 24 April 1684, he was appointed during the papacy of Pope Innocent XI as Bishop of Feltre. On 1 May 1684, he was consecrated bishop by Alessandro Crescenzi (cardinal), Cardinal-Priest of Santa Prisca, with Francesco Maria Giannotti, Bishop of Segni, and Francesco Onofrio Hodierna, Bishop of Bitetto, serving as co-consecrators. He served as Bishop of Feltre until his death in April 1724.

While bishop, he was the principal co-consecrator of Giovanni Tommaso Maria Marelli, Archbishop of Urbino (1716).

References

External links and additional sources
  (for Chronology of Bishops) 
  (for Chronology of Bishops) 

17th-century Roman Catholic bishops in the Republic of Venice
Bishops appointed by Pope Innocent XI
1647 births
1724 deaths